St Benet's Abbey was a  medieval monastery of the Order of Saint Benedict, also  known as St Benet's at Holme or Hulme. It was situated on the River Bure within the Broads in Norfolk, England. St Benet is a medieval English version of the name of St Benedict of Nursia, hailed as the founder of western monasticism.
At the period of the Dissolution of the Monasteries the abbey's possessions were in effect seized by the crown and assigned to the diocese of Norwich. Though the monastery was supposed to continue as a community, within a few years at least the monks had dispersed. Today there remain only ruins.

The Abbey in Anglo-Saxon times

The early history of the monastery has to be told tentatively since it is difficult to reconcile the surviving sources with what is known of the bigger picture of the development of the area. It is said that St Benet's was founded on the site of a 9th-century monastery where the hermit Suneman was martyred by the Danes. About the end of the 10th century it was rebuilt by one Wulfric. A generation later, c. 1022,  King Canute conferred on it his manors of Horning, Ludham and Neatishead.

Canute appears to have endowed at the same time another Benedictine monastery that was later Bury St Edmunds Abbey, at Beodricsworth, afterwards known as St Edmundsbury, where since the early 10th century, the relics of the martyred king, St Edmund had been venerated. With this new endowment, under the auspices of the Bishop of Elmham and Dunwich, the original community was reinforced or replaced by a party consisting of half of the monks of St Benet's Abbey under Prior Uvius or Ufi. They arrived bearing half of all the furniture, books, sacred vestments and other worship items belonging to St Benet's. Ufi became Bury's first abbot and governed until his death in 1043. He  was blessed as abbot by the Bishop of London. His successor (1044–1065) was Leofstan, another of the former St Benet's monks.

Other early benefactors of St Benet's included Earl Ralf II of East Anglia and Edith Swannesha, concubine to Harold II.

In 1065 St Benet's Abbey was in good enough condition to establish a cell, later Rumburgh Priory in Suffolk. However, towards the end of the 12th century this became a dependency of St Mary's Abbey in York. This happened by means of a gift made by the patron, who was either Stephen of Penthièvre, Count of Tréguier, Lord of Richmond or his son Alan of Penthièvre, Earl of Richmond and Cornwall.

It was the first abbot of St Benet's Abbey, Elsinus, who procured stone to replace the wooden structure of the abbey's church. This must have been a notable operation since suitable stone does not occur in the vicinity. The work was completed by the second abbot, Thurstan, who when he died in 1064 is reported to have been buried before the altar in the chapel of St Michael within the abbey church.

 
At the time of the Norman conquest King Harold Godwinson put the abbot of St Benet's, in charge of defending the East Anglian coast against invasion. The involvement with military naval matters was naturally incumbent upon the abbot, as upon bishops and monastic superiors throughout England, in so far as he was a prominent public personage and landowner in the area and hence an integral element in the feudal system. The abbey was responsible for organizing a shipsoke or grouping of several hundreds which then had the obligation of providing a fighting ship. It is possible that the abbey did in fact provide the King Harold's ship.

The Abbey after the Conquest
After the Conquest, William the Conqueror pursued those seen as having supported the defeated Harold and Abbot Aelfwold was outlawed and exiled for a time to Denmark,  and the abbey's estates suffered encroachments by neighbouring landowners and a general campaign of systematic harassment by the tenants of the upcoming Norman magnate Sir Roger Bigod, whom the Domesday Book gives as holding 187 lordships in Norfolk and another 117 in Suffolk. The harassment was to continue for a long period of time. In the reign of Henry II (1154–1189) the church at Ranworth, which was the property of the abbey, was stolen bodily, and being a timber building, was dismantled and spirited away. It took a command from the King to have it returned.

John of Oxnead (de Oxenedes), a 13th-century monk of St Benet's, says in his Chronicle that Abbot Aelfwold was later able to return and resume his post, dying at the abbey as abbot on 14 November 1089.  He was succeeded as abbot by Ralph, and Ralph in 1101 by Richard, who is credited with having completed the church's western tower and with having hung two large bells there.

The site was not immune to natural disasters and in the 13th and 14th centuries there were incidents where violent storms on the coast forced the sea to break through the dunes, causing damage to the abbey. In 1287 to save the horses, they had to be brought from the stables to shelter on higher land in the nave of the church. The abbey also remained vulnerable to hostile incursions by water and in 1327 by royal licence the site was enclosed by a wall with battlements, isolated traces of which still survive.

Surviving records from the 12th century show that at least some of the abbey's tenants paid their rents in kind or by means of service rendered. At Swanton Abbott the lease for a mill and a piece of land were four fat cocks a year, land at Potter Heigham was paid each year with a supply of beer for the monks, another stretch of land at Banningham was rented for eight measures of honey and a property in London for a pound of pepper and a pound of cummin, while two churches, one at Stalham and one in Norwich had to present the abbey annually with a pound of incense each.

Abbots with connections
That the abbey continued to have connections to the court may be shown by the fact that the man who became abbot in 1126 was Conrad, who has been identified with the monk who till then had been prior of Christ Church Cathedral Priory, Canterbury, and who had been confessor to King Henry I. Conrad is said to have brought with him two chasubles and a book that had been the property of St Dunstan, Archbishop of Canterbury, together with a chalice Dunstan himself had made. These objects were conserved at St Benet's as relics.

Later that same century another abbot with even stronger connections to power arrived to govern St Benet's. Hugh was an illegimitate half-brother to Cardinal William of the White Hands and to Count Henry I of Champagne who was married to Marie, elder daughter of King Louis VII of France. Hugh's half-sister was Adela, Queen of France and he was a nephew of King Stephen of England and of the King's brother Henry of Blois Henry of Blois, Bishop of Winchester.

Hugh became a knight and was wounded in battle about 1136. Cared for at Tiron Abbey in France, when he recovered he decided to become a monk there. Later he was made  abbot of St Benet's (1146-1150) thanks to his uncle King Stephen (or Henry of Blois), the appointment receiving  papal confirmation in 1147. To secure this post for Hugh, the previous abbot, Daniel, was deposed.

The story in John of Oxnead's Chronicle is that he was a capable and serious abbot but made powerful enemies who framed him by having a woman slipped into his bed and then sent armed men to punish the supposed crime by castrating him. After the violence, John of Oxnead says, Hugh's uncle King Stephen obtained for him the post of abbot of Chertsey Abbey (1149-1163) in Surrey and at St Benet's Abbot Daniel returned to his post. Subsequently, the death of King Stephen lead to a hostile climate in England for the family and Henry of Blois fled from England in 1155. Hugh followed, returning to Champagne and becoming once more a monk of  Tiron Abbey. However, when trouble arose at Lagny Abbey, he was made abbot there (1163-1171). Though an active abbot, for some reason was deposed in 1171 and died shortly afterwards, being buried at the abbey.

Local cults
Despite elements of success, both material and spiritual, the abbey may have struggled to compete in religious prestige, lacking as it did the relics of an important saint. It seems that alongside a circumscribed veneration for the memory of the hermit Wulfric or Wulfey, who was said to have occupied the site before the abbey's foundation, in the 12-13th centuries the abbey tried to promote the cult of St Margaret of Holm, supposedly a girl killed in the woods at Hoveton St John on 22 May 1170, but this made little or no progress.

Benefactions
The abbey's life had substantially begun with benefactions and despite attempts both surreptitious and aggressive to snatch them away, the benefactions continued. It has been suggested that participation in 1075 of an early patron, Ralph Guader, Earl of East Anglia, in the failed Revolt of the Earls against William the Conqueror and his subsequent flight to Brittany may have caused later patrons to divert their benefactions to other monasteries. Nevertheless, benefactions there were, to the points that by the late 13th century St Benet's had property in 76 parishes.

One of the abbey's great benefactors was Sir John Fastolf, the inspiration for Shakespeare's Falstaff, who died at Caister and was buried at St Benet's in December 1459, next to his wife Millicent in a new aisle built by Fastolf himself on the south side of the abbey church. The bulk of his fortune passed to Magdalen College, Oxford, but his intention to establish a chantry at Caister Castle did not materialize.

Later ownership

After the Dissolution the greater part of the buildings at the site were demolished, with the exclusion of the gatehouse, which is now a Grade I listed building.

In the second half of the 18th century, a farmer built a windmill, later converted to a windpump, inside the abbey gatehouse, removing the second floor of the gatehouse in the process.

From the early 18th century, active attention was paid to drainage of the marshland around the site. From various surviving illustrations, it appears that a first windmill-powered land drainage was erected around the middle of the 18th century, and some decades later was replaced by another, attached to the front of the ruined gatehouse. By at least 1813, to facilitate movement of the windmill sails the upper floor of the gatehouse was removed to provide room for the sails to turn. The sails survived until at least 1854 but had been destroyed by 1863.

The wind-powered mechanism, which at time ceased operating and is itself now a ruin, is a grade II* listed building.

Between 1782 and 1886 just along the river from the gatehouse there was a wherryman's riverside pub called The Chequers.

In 1925 the site became one of Britain's first scheduled ancient monuments.

In 1993 the main part of the site was bought by the Crown Estate and in 2002 sold to the Norfolk Archaeological Trust which in 2004 purchased the gatehouse and mill from the Diocese of Norwich. The ruins of the church remain the property of the diocese, which has leased them to the Trust for 199 years. In recent years essential conservation repairs have been carried out on the ruins and visits to the site have been facilitated by the laying out of a new car park and access paths, while large numbers of volunteers undertook graffiti recording, molehill and wildlife surveys, and maintenance and provided guides. Aside from several scientific studies, the site has become the focus of intense local interest.

On 2 August 1987 a cross made from oak from the royal estate at Sandringham was erected on the high altar.

Abbots
The years listed are election dates.

A modern bishop-abbot?

It has been claimed that St Benet's is the only religious house not closed down by Henry VIII during the Dissolution of the Monasteries, but that instead he united the Abbacy with the Bishopric of Norwich. It would follow that the Bishops of Norwich have remained abbots of St Benet's to this day. The Bishop of Norwich, as Abbot, arrives once a year, standing in the bow of a wherry and preaches at the annual service on the first Sunday of August. However, the grant of the abbacy to the Bishop was on the basis of his maintaining a community of twelve monks under a prior, whereas by 1540 no such community existed, and hence the abbey would appear to have become extinct in that period and the claim therefore arguably spurious. Nevertheless, the abbey was not technically abolished. Whatever the case, it has given rise to popular modern folklore.

References

Further reading
 
 
 
 
 Stephen Cooper, The Real Falstaff, Sir John Fastolf and the Hundred Years War (Pen & Sword, 2010)

External links 

 Norfolk Archaeological Trust - Owners of St Benet's at Holme
 St Benet's Abbey Mill History

Monasteries in Norfolk
Christian monasteries established in the 9th century
9th-century establishments in England
Benet
Benedictine monasteries in England
1545 disestablishments
Ruins in Norfolk
Ruined abbeys and monasteries
Windmills of the Norfolk Broads
Grade I listed buildings in Norfolk
Tourist attractions in Norfolk